The 2017 Jalisco Open will be a professional tennis tournament played on hard courts. It will be the seventh edition of the tournament which will be part of the 2017 ATP Challenger Tour. It will take place in Guadalajara, Mexico between 21 and 26 March 2017.

Singles main-draw entrants

Seeds

 1 Rankings as of March 6, 2017.

Other entrants
The following players received wildcards into the singles main draw:
  Hans Hach Verdugo
  Eduardo Yahir Orozco Rangel
  Luis Patiño
  Manuel Sánchez

The following players received entry into the singles main draw as alternates:
  Adrián Menéndez Maceiras
  Caio Zampieri

The following players received entry from the qualifying draw:
  Alex De Minaur
  Lloyd Glasspool
  Emilio Gómez
  Austin Krajicek

Champions

Singles

 Mirza Bašić def.  Denis Shapovalov 6–4, 6–4.

Doubles

 Santiago González /  Artem Sitak def.  Luke Saville /  John-Patrick Smith 6–3, 1–6, [10–5].

External links
Official Website

Jalisco Open
Jalisco Open
2017 in Mexican tennis